Penguin: Pain and Prejudice is a comic book limited series focusing on the Batman villain Penguin, written by Gregg Hurwitz and published by DC Comics. IGN rated its individual issues between 8.0 and 9.0 out of 10.

References

Books by Gregg Hurwitz